The Princess Royal Hospital, also known as PRH, is an acute, teaching, general hospital located in Haywards Heath, West Sussex, England.  It is the main hospital in the Mid Sussex district and is part of University Hospitals Sussex NHS Foundation Trust along with the larger Royal Sussex County Hospital and several other facilities, mostly in nearby Brighton.

History
The hospital stands on part of the site of St Francis Hospital, a mental hospital founded as the Sussex County Lunatic Asylum in 1859. The new buildings were completed in 1991. In 2017 local councillors expressed concerns that the hospital was at risk of being downgraded.

Services
The hospital has medical and surgical facilities, along with adult intensive care, ear, nose & throat, diabetic medicine, geriatrics, haematology, urology and cardiac services. It works interdependently with the other hospitals in the trust to provide a complete service.

Performance
As a trust (including the other sites), the hospital was rated 6th best in the country for safety, and in the top 5% for hospital survival rates, in the year 2009-10.

See also
 Healthcare in Sussex
 List of hospitals in England

References

External links 

 
 Inspection reports from the Care Quality Commission

Hospital buildings completed in 1991
Hospitals in West Sussex
1991 establishments in England
Haywards Heath
NHS hospitals in England